Bangladesh national under-20 football team represents Bangladesh in international youth football competitions in SAFF U-18 Championship, AFC U-19 Championship and FIFA U-20 World Cup, as well as any other under-20 & under-19 international football tournaments. The team is operated under the Bangladesh Football Federation.

Bangladesh have qualified for the AFC U-19 Championship six previous times and is yet to qualify for FIFA U-20 World Cup. The team also takes part in the SAFF U-18 Championship, however, is yet to win the trophy. From 2022, the Bangladesh U-20 team will take part in the SAFF Championship and AFC Championship, after rebranding of both tournaments.

History

1975−2000
After becoming affiliated with the Asian Football Confederation in 1973, the Bangladesh team were given direct entry into the 1975 AFC Youth Championship & 1977 AFC Youth Championship, although they ended both tournaments without achieving a single victory. The Bangladesh Football Federation however, failed to arrange a regular youth setup as the team did not participate during the 1974 and 1976 editions of the tournament even after acquiring AFC membership.

The 1978 AFC Youth Championship was held in Dhaka, becoming the first major football tournament held in Bangladesh. Coaches Abdur Rahim and Abdus Sadek were given the task of building the team with three months to go. However, West Germany's Werner Bickelhaupt came as the head coach of the team on the initiative of FIFA. Bickelhaupt, the first foreign football coach of Bangladesh's national team at any level, later served as the coach of the senior team as well. Beckelhoft's selected Bangladesh team consisted of: Suhas Barua, Moin, Dewan Arefin Tutul, Abul Hossain, Sawpan Das, Mukul, Kawsar Ali, Abdus Salam, Md. Badal, Ashish Bhadra, Aslam, Hasanuzzaman Bablu, Kazi Anwar, Hasan Ahmadul Haque, Golam Rabbani Helal, Salam Murshedy, Mohammed Mohsin (captain). Standby: Abdul Halim, Majid, Ghaffer, Moni, Wahiduzzaman Pintu. The team leader was Zillur Rahman, joint manager Nabi Chowdhury and AQZ Islam Kislu and assistant coach Abdur Rahim. Bangladesh were drawn into Group C with Singapore, North Yemen, Bahrain and Kuwait. All games were held at the Bangabandhu National Stadium.

Bangladesh's first match was against Singapore. A quick double from Singapore striker Donang, saw the hosts fall behind 2–0. However, goals from Ashish Bhadra and captain Mohsin meant the game finished 2–2. In the next game against North Yemen, the Bangladesh team created history by winning the game 1–0, thanks to a lone goal by striker Hasan Ahmadul Haque. However, the next match saw Bangladesh being defeated 2–0 by Kuwait, the team ended the tournament with a 1–1 draw against Bahrain thanks to a penalty taken by Moshin. The draw meant Bangladesh had failed to reach the quarter-finals finishing a point behind Bahrain, even after going toe to toe with much stronger opposition. Bangladesh then took part in the 1980 AFC Youth Championship, thanks to Sheikh Aslam's goals during qualification. The team finished bottom of their group in the main tournament, having been drawn in a tough group Bangladesh managed earn points against South Korea and Qatar.

Bangladesh almost managed to qualify for the 1985 AFC Youth Championship, after finishing second in their qualifying group alongside South Korea, the team were knocked out of the qualifiers after losing 1–0 in the semi-finals to China. Bangladesh ended up losing the 3rd place match to South Korea. Bangladesh did not participate in the next two out of the four Youth Championship qualifiers, before again qualifying in 1996 after defeating Maldives 8–0 in aggregate. However, in the main tournament, the team disappointed conceding a total of twelve goals in four games, salvaging only a goalless draw against Iran.

2000−present
After being unfortunate to not qualify for the 2000 AFC Youth Championship, the Bangladesh team managed to qualify for the 2002 AFC Youth Championship, held in Qatar. Nevertheless, they failed to win a single game during the entirety of the Championship. Since 2002, the Bangladesh U20 team was unable to take part in a major tournament until the launching of SAFF U-18 Championship, in 2015. The 2015 SAFF U-19 Championship which was the tournaments first edition was held in Nepal. Rohit Sarkar and Mannaf Rabby scored as Bangladesh defeated Bhutan in their maiden SAFF U-18 Championship game. After advancing to the semi-final as group runner-up, Bangladesh came up short during the penalty shoot-out to India as Rahmat Mia missed the last penalty.

Mahabub Hossain Roksy's team made a remarkable comeback during the opening game of the 2017 SAFF U-18 Championship. After falling 3-0 behind, goals from Jafar Iqbal, Rahmat Mia and Mahbubur Rahman saw Bangladesh win the game 4–3. However, after losing to Nepal 2–1, Bangladesh finished in second place due to head to head results. Roxy's team also showed some promising displays during the 2018 AFC U-19 Championship qualifiers (previously known as the AFC Youth Championship) although they failed to qualify once more. Atikuzzaman's owngoal in the 94th minute against Uzbekistan, lead to Bangladesh's only defeat during the qualifiers. Bangladesh reached the final of the 2019 SAFF U-18 Championship, only to lose to India 1–2. Bangladesh conceded the first goal within two minutes and although they were down to 10-men after Mohammad Ridoy was sent off after a scuffle with the Indian players, captain Yeasin Arafat equalized just before half-time, but the referee sent him off due to his celebrations and Indian striker Ravi Rana scored the winner in stoppage time to seal his sides victory. The teams fate kept on worsening as, they finished bottom of their group during the 2020 AFC U-19 Championship qualifiers.

Due to the ongoing domestic league season, Bangladesh team for the 2022 SAFF U-20 Championship mainly consisted U-17 players from the BFF Elite Football Academy and Bangladesh Championship League. The team was impressive throughout the tournament but had similar fate to the previous edition, as they lost to India in the final.

Coaches

Coaching staff

Manager history

Squad
This is the squad which is announced for the 2023 AFC U-20 Asian Cup qualifiers.

|-
! colspan="9"  style="background:#b0d3fb; text-align:left;"|
|- style="background:#dfedfd;"

|-
! colspan="9"  style="background:#b0d3fb; text-align:left;"|
|- style="background:#dfedfd;"

|-
! colspan="9"  style="background:#b0d3fb; text-align:left;"|
|- style="background:#dfedfd;"

Fixtures and results
legend

Competition records

FIFA U-20 World Cup

AFC U-20 Asian Cup

SAFF U-20 Championship

Honours
SAFF U-19 Championship
Runners-up (2): 2017, 2019
SAFF U-20 Championship
Runners-up (1): 2022

See also 
Bangladesh national football team
Bangladesh national under-23 football team
Bangladesh national under-17 football team
Bangladesh women's national football team
Bangladesh women's national under-17 football team
Bangladesh women's national under-20 football team

References

External links
 Bangladesh Football Federation

under-20
Youth football in Bangladesh
Asian national under-20 association football teams